Chrysoritis balli is a species of butterfly in the family Lycaenidae. It is endemic to South Africa. It is mostly treated as a subspecies of Chrysoritis pyramus.

Sources
 

Butterflies described in 1981
Chrysoritis
Endemic butterflies of South Africa
Taxonomy articles created by Polbot
Taxobox binomials not recognized by IUCN